Lake Unari is a medium-sized lake in Finnish Lapland, in the municipality of Sodankylä. It belongs to Kemijoki main catchment area.

See also
List of lakes in Finland

References

Lakes of Sodankylä